Aleksei Anatolyevich Snigiryov (born 19 January 1968) is a former Russian professional footballer.

Club career
He made his debut in the Soviet Top League in 1991 for FC Dynamo Moscow.

He is the record holder for the club last known as FC Moscow with most league goals scored for the club (52). The club was called FC Torpedo-ZIL Moscow when Snigiryov played for it.

His last professional club was Neman Grodno in 2003. He continued to play at amateur level in regional Russian leagues until 2008.

Honours
 Russian Premier League runner-up: 1995.
 Russian Cup winner: 1996.
 Russian Second Division Zone West top scorer: 1998 (32 goals).

References

External links
 

1968 births
Living people
Sportspeople from Pskov
Soviet footballers
Russian footballers
Association football forwards
Russian expatriate footballers
Expatriate footballers in Ukraine
Russian expatriate sportspeople in Ukraine
Expatriate footballers in Slovakia
Russian expatriate sportspeople in Slovakia
Expatriate footballers in Belarus
Russian expatriate sportspeople in Belarus
Russian Premier League players
Ukrainian Premier League players
FC Dynamo Moscow players
FC Tyumen players
NK Veres Rivne players
FC KAMAZ Naberezhnye Chelny players
FC Lokomotiv Moscow players
FC Moscow players
FC VSS Košice players
Slovak Super Liga players
FC Vityaz Podolsk players
FC Khimki players
FC Neman Grodno players
FC Spartak Ryazan players